The Algoma Stakes is a Canadian Thoroughbred horse race run annually at Woodbine Racetrack in Toronto, Ontario. Restricted to Canadian-Bred and foaled fillies and mares, age three and older, the Algoma Stakes is one of the CTHS Yearling Sales Stakes. It is contested on Polytrack synthetic dirt over a distance of one and one-sixteenth miles (8.5 furlongs).

Records
Speed  record: 
 1:42.90 - Roses 'n' Wine (2009)

Most wins:
 3 - One For Rose (2003, 2004, 2005)

Most wins by an owner:
 3 - Tucci Stables (2003, 2004, 2005)

Most wins by a jockey:
 3 - Emile Ramsammy (2003, 2004, 2005)

Most wins by a trainer:
 3 - Roger Attfield (1992, 1994, 2002)
 3 - Sid C. Attard (2003, 2004, 2005)

Winners

References
 September 8, 2009 CTHS report on the 2009 Algoma Stakes

External links
 The Algoma Stakes at Peigree Query

Restricted stakes races in Canada
Recurring sporting events established in 1992
Woodbine Racetrack